The Gabas is a left tributary of the Adour, in the Landes, in the Southwest of France.

Name 
The name Gabas is derived from the French gave (Gascon: 'gabe'), which in the Pyrenees generically describes a small or large watercourse. The river was known as the fluvius gavasensis in 982.

A tributary of the Léez is named the Gabassot, a hypocoristic of Gabas.

Geography 
The Gabas rises in the plateau of Ger in the north of Lourdes, as the union of the Gabastou and the Honrède. It flows north-west like the neighboring rivers: the Luy, the Uzan and the Ousse.

The Gabas crosses the Tursan, in the Landes. It flows into the Adour in Toulouzette, downstream from Saint-Sever.

Main tributaries 
 (R) the Bayle from Lourenties
 (R) the Bas, from Geaune
 (R) the Lescoû, from Saint-Loubouer
 (L) the Petit Bas, from Pimbo
 (L) the Laudon, from Hagetmau

References

Rivers of France
Rivers of Landes (department)
Rivers of Nouvelle-Aquitaine
Nouvelle-Aquitaine region articles needing translation from French Wikipedia